Praitori is a village and a community of the Elassona municipality. Before the 2011 local government reform it was a part of the municipality of Potamia, of which it was a municipal district. The 2011 census recorded 362 inhabitants in the village. The community of Praitori covers an area of 14.957 km2.

History
The settlement is recorded as village under the name "Pritor" in an Ottoman Defter of 1521. In the 19th century the village became a chiflik of Ali Pasha.

Economy
The population of Praitori is occupied in animal husbandry and agriculture (mainly tobacco and grain).

Population
According to the 2011 census, the population of the settlement of Praitori was 362 people, a decrease of almost 14% compared with the population of the previous census of 2001.

See also
 List of settlements in the Larissa regional unit

References

Populated places in Larissa (regional unit)